Lee Hyung-chul (born February 19, 1971) is a South Korean actor. He is best known for his supporting roles in television dramas, notably in Scent of Man (2003), Sisters of the Sea (2005), On Air (2008), City Hall (2009), Pasta (2010), War of the Roses (2011) and You Are the Boss! (2013). In 2008, Lee played Henry Higgins in the stage musical My Fair Lady.

Filmography

Television series

Film

Musical theatre

Awards and nominations

References

External links
 
 
 
 

1971 births
Living people
20th-century South Korean male actors
21st-century South Korean male actors
South Korean male television actors
South Korean male film actors
South Korean male musical theatre actors